Harpobittacus australis is an Australian species  of insect in the family Bittacidae found in the southern states of New South Wales, Victoria, South Australia and Tasmania .

References

Hangingflies
Insects of Australia